Thomas Cottrell (August 10, 1815 – March 24, 1907) was a political figure in New Brunswick. He represented Charlotte County in the Legislative Assembly of New Brunswick from 1874 to 1882 as a Liberal member.

He was born in Saint David, New Brunswick and educated there. In 1836, he married Annie Wyman. Cottrell was a captain in the local militia. He died in 1907 in Eureka, California.

References 

The Canadian parliamentary companion and annual register, 1880, CH Mackintosh

1815 births
1907 deaths
New Brunswick Liberal Association MLAs